Gervasio Gestori (1 February 1936 – 6 January 2023) was an Italian Roman Catholic bishop.

Ordained to the priesthood on 28 June 1959, Gestori was named bishop of the Roman Catholic Diocese of San Benedetto del Tronto-Ripatransone-Montalto on 21 June 1996, and retired on 4 November 2013.

References 

1936 births
2023 deaths
20th-century Italian Roman Catholic bishops
21st-century Italian Roman Catholic bishops
Bishops appointed by Pope John Paul II
People from the Province of Monza e Brianza
Bishops in le Marche